The Kanun (also , other names include ) is a set of Albanian traditional customary laws, which has directed all the aspects of the Albanian tribal society.

For at least the last five centuries and until today, Albanian customary laws have been kept alive only orally by the tribal elders. The success in preserving them exclusively through oral systems highlights their universal resilience and provides evidence of their likely ancient origins. Strong pre-Christian motifs mixed with motifs from the Christian era reflect the stratification of the Albanian customary law across various historical ages. Over time, Albanian customary laws have undergone their historical development, they have been changed and supplemented with new norms, in accordance with certain requirements of socio-economic development. Besa and nderi (honour) are of major importance in Albanian customary law as the cornerstone of personal and social conduct.

The first known codification of Albanian oral customary law was published by the Ottoman administration in the 19th century. Several regional Albanian customary laws have been collected and published during the 20th and 21st centuries, including The Kanun of Lekë Dukagjini, The Kanun of Skanderbeg  and The Kanun of Labëria. During the years of the communist regime, the Albanian state abolished by law the customary practices. However their exercise returned after the 1990s as a result of the collapse of state institutions in Albania and in Kosovo. In Albania, in particular, the exercise of customary law was observed especially in matters related to property law.

Name
The term kanun comes from the Greek "" ("canon"), meaning amongst others "pole" or "rule" and was transported from Greek to Arabic and then into early Turkish. The term must have been divulgated during the Ottoman rule. It was so widely used among Albanians that when something was legal it was said to be "kanun", and when not legal, "the kanun doesn't give it". The consuetudinary law was called "kanun". Baroness Von Godin thought it was the Ottomans that gave the name kanun and that the Albanian name Lek (latin lex) was only later perceived as a proper name attributed to late Medieval nobleman of the Dukagjini family.

Aside from the term kanun other words of Turkish extract were used (usull, itifak, adet) or in the Albanian periphrase "rrugë" or "udhë" (way or path). In Martanesh and Çermenikë it was known as "kanun", in Toskëria it was known as "The Kanun of the Adet", in Labëria "The sharte of Idriz Suli", in the Bregu district Venomet e Himarës. but in Dibër, Kurbin, Bendë and Tamadhe it was called zakon (from slavonic законъ).
According to Çabej, Camaj and Schmidt-Neke, the oldest Albanian word by which the customary law was known was doke, meaning "custom", "usance", "tradition" in Albanian.

Origin 
The stratification of the Albanian oral customary law across the various historical eras is reflected in its powerful pre-Christian motifs mixed with
motifs from the Christian era; the following strata have been identified: pre-Indo-European, Indo-European, Ancient Greek, Ancient Roman, general Balkan and Osmanli.

Some scholars have defined the Albanian Kanun as a set of traditions which are more or less ancient and widespread in the Balkans and in the Mediterranean area, however it should be considered independently as a "customary code and a normative heritage" of a people who, on the basis of their own social sense, have created a legal system that was autonomous from the law enforced by the various conquerors. In other words, it can be defined as a 'constitution' of a stateless social system.

The Albanian Kanun contains several customary concepts that have their origins in pagan beliefs, including in particular the ancestor worship, animism and totemism, which date back long before the period of Lekë Dukagjini. Comparing the Albanian Kanun of the Mountains with the Iliad and the Odyssey, the Japanese scholar Kazuhiko Yamamoto has concluded that the basic ethical concepts of the stateless social structure of the Homeric Age — 'faith', 'honor', 'blood', 'revenge', 'food', and 'guest' — are the same customary concepts of the Albanian tribal society.

British anthropologist and writer Edith Durham has suggested that the Albanian Kanun likely dates back to the Bronze Age culture. Other scholars have suggested that it retains elements from Indo-European prehistoric eras. Others further have conjectured that it may derive from ancient Illyrian tribal laws.

For at least the last five centuries and until today, the Kanun has been kept alive only orally by Albanian tribal elders. The success in preserving them exclusively through oral systems highlights their universal resilience and provides evidence of their likely ancient origins. In his codification of the Kanun Shtjefën Gjeçovi added footnotes in reference to the Roman law, and an earlier indigenous legal system that survived the Roman occupation can be seen in the doke.

History
According to some historical sources, the government of the Roman and Byzantine empire had to recognize autonomous customary laws to the various local communities for their self-administration. In this context, during different periods, Albanian customary laws were implemented in parallel with Roman, Byzantine, Ecclesiastic, and subsequently Sharia and Ottoman laws. This helped the Albanian mountain tribes to preserve their way of life, identity, and neutrality in the face of external centralizing administration.

In the context of religious perceptions, historical sources confirm the relations between the Greco-Roman religious ethics and the Albanian customary laws. These relations can be seen during the rule of the Illyrian emperors, such as Aurelian who introduced the cult of the Sun; Diocletian who stabilized the empire and ensured its continuation through the institution of the Tetrarchy; Constantine the Great who issued the Edict of Toleration for the Christianized population and who summoned the First Council of Nicaea involving many clercs from Illyricum; Justinian who issued the Corpus Juris Civilis and sought to create an Illyrian Church, building Justiniana Prima and Justiniana Secunda, which was intended to become the centre of Byzantine administration.

The Byzantine Empire ruled over Albanians for a long period of time, exercising with its institutions influence on the Albanians as well as on other Balkan ethnicities such as the Serbs. Some influence from Serbian medieval law might have reached Northern Albanian customary law through Montenegro and Herzegovina, as the latter seem to show traces of Serbian medieval law. Albanians and Montenegrins have experienced very strong mutual influences on customary law, religious life and cultural life, and also Albanians, Serbs and Macedonians have experienced mutual influences, albeit to a lesser extent.

In the Statutes of Scutari the verb bessare is thought to be a trace of Old Albanian, thence viewed as in relation to an early evidence of the Albanian institution of Besa. It has been argued that an article in Dušan's Code can be considered speculatively as an early attempt to clamp down on the self-administered Albanian customary law of the mountains, and if so, this would be an early evidence that such customary laws were in effect. Soon after the institution of Dušan's Code in Albanian life, the Ottomans conquered large parts of the Balkans, and instead of Dušan's Code  customary law and several other patriarchal structures of social organisation were thereafter revived, in particular among the Albanians.

In 1492, the Sublime Porte officially recognized Himara its own customary law for self-government, as it was the center of the Labëria uprisings against the Ottoman Empire. When the Ottoman administration became acquainted with the social organization of the Albanian lands, around 1550 they mentioned the local customary law as Canun of the Mountains. In the 17th century an anonymous prepared a study in the Venetian language: Informazioni sopra origine e metodo delle arbitrarie in affari di sangue in Albania (sec. XVIII) interessante pei costumi (Reale Archivio Generale, Cancelleria Secreta, Cattaro e popolazioni confinarie) (Information on the origin and method of arbitration in the matter of blood-taking in Albania), addressed to the Republic of Venice in order to harmonize the state laws of Venice with the Kanun of the Albanians in the area from Kotor to Shkodra where the rule of the Venetian administration extended. The Venetian Senate did not approve the study because no other law was to be recognized in its provinces. In the same century, some English travelers who visited Himara wrote about a strong customary law implemented by the local population.

In his autonomous Pashalik, the Albanian ruler Ali Pasha enforced his own laws in addition to the Sharia for Muslims and Canon law for Christians, allowing only in rare cases the usage of local Albanian tribal customary laws. After annexing Suli and Himara into his semi-independent state in 1798, he sought to organize the judiciary in every city and province according to the principle of social equality, enforcing his laws for the entire population, both Muslims and Christians. To limit blood feud killings, Ali Pasha replaced blood feuds (Albanian: gjakmarrje) with other punishments such as blood payment or expulsion up to the death penalty. Ali Pasha also reached an agreement with the Kurveleshi population, not to trespass their territories, which at that time were larger than the area they inhabit today. Since the 18th century and continuously, blood feuds and their consequences in Labëria have been limited principally by the councils of elders. The mountain region of Kurveleshi represents the last example of a tribal system among southern Albanians, which was regulated by the Code of Zuli (Albanian: Kanuni i Papa Zhulit/Zulit or Kanuni i Idriz Sulit).

During the Tanzimat and the implementation of reforms, the Ottoman administration, in order to address the Albanian customary law which has been implemented along with the Ottoman law and Sharia, opened an office called "Shkodra Mountains Commission" (Turkish: Iskodra Xhibali Komisi), which was established in 1856–1858, based in Shkodra and with administrative and judicial power over the provinces. The Commission embodied the centralized attitudes of the imperial reforms and the approach it would have with local customary law in the bajrak areas and relied mainly on the Kanun of the Mountains (Turkish: Kanun-i Jhibal) with some Ottoman administrative element. In 1863 the bylykbashi of Gruda sent a letter to the sergeant asking for the Kanun-i Jhibal, giving reason to believe that a codification in Ottoman Turkish already existed. Parts of this codification have been published in twenty paragraphs in the salname of the Vilayet of Shkodra in 1894, which were published translated into Italian and French. The most important elements for the relationship between the Ottoman administration and the local population were: murder, blood feud, reconciliation, blood money, hospitality, theft, and tribal disputes.

Development and usage 
The Kanun of Lek Dukagjini was named after Lekë Dukagjini, a medieval prince who ruled in northern Albania and codified the customary laws of the highlands. The code was written down in the 19th century by Shtjefën Gjeçovi and partially published in the Hylli i Drites periodical in 1913. The full version appeared only in 1933 after Gjeçovi's death in 1926.

Although researchers of history and customs of Albania usually refer to Gjeçovi's text of the Kanuni as the only existing version which is uncontested and written by Lekë Dukagjini, it was actually incorrect. The text of the Kanuni, often contested and with many different interpretations which significantly evolved since 15th century, was codified and only named by Dukagjini.

Although the laws are attributed to Lekë Dukagjini, the laws evolved over time as a way to bring order to these lands. The Kanun is divided into 12 sections, and Gjeçovi's version has 1,262 articles regulating all aspects of the mountainous life: economic organisation of the household, hospitality, brotherhood, clan, boundaries, work, marriage, land, and so on. The Besa (personal honour, compare with Lat. fides) and nderi (family honour, Lat. honor) are of prime importance throughout the code as the cornerstone of personal and social conduct. The Kanun applies to both Christian and Muslim Albanians.

Some of the Kanun's most controversial rules (in particular book 10 section 3) specify how murder is to be handled, which in the past (and sometimes still now) would lead to blood feuds lasting until all men of the two involved families were killed. In situations of murder, tribal law stipulates the principle of koka për kokë (head for a head) where the relatives of the victim are obliged to seek gjakmarrja (blood vengeance). Regarded simply as  producers of offspring, women are referred to in a discriminatory manner and not considered worthy targets as such.  In some parts of the country, the Kanun resembles the Italian vendetta. These rules resurfaced in the 1990s in Northern Albania, as people had no faith in the powerless local government and police. There are organizations that try to mediate between feuding families and try to get them to "pardon the blood", but often the only resort is for men of age to stay in their homes, which are considered a safe refuge by the Kanuni, or flee the country. Tribal laws also held that thieves would need to pay fines for the relative amount that was stolen.

Albanian tribes from the Dibra region (known as the "Tigers of Dibra") governed themselves according to the Law of Skanderbeg.

The Albanian Bytyqi,  Gashi,  Gruda, Trieshi, Hoti,  Kastrati,  Kelmendi,  Krasniqi, Shkrel, and Kuçi tribes are known to follow the Kanuni i Malësisë së Madhë, a variant of the Kanun. Its implementation extends from these tribal regions around Shkodër to the Highlands of Gjakova.

Former communist leader of Albania Enver Hoxha effectively stopped the practice of Kanun with hard repression and a strong state police. After Communism's fall some communities, however, have tried to rediscover the old traditions, but some of their parts have been lost, leading to fears of misinterpretation. In 2014, about 3,000 Albanian families were estimated to be involved in blood feuds; since the fall of Communism this has led to the deaths of 10,000 people. There is extensive debate on the number of blood feuds and deaths in the present day, a major factor being the use of blood feuds in asylum applications. Cedoca reported in 2017 that, according to Albanian State Police Headquarters, from 2013 to March 2017, there were five deaths related to blood feuds; that said, the British embassy in Tirana claims that police 'tend to estimate the lowest numbers' when reporting the population involved in blood feuds. Albanian Daily News reported in 2018 that one man had died due to a blood feud.

Codifications
The first known codification of Albanian oral customary law is Lek Dukagin Kanunu ("The Kanun of Lekë Dukagjini") by the Ottoman administration, published in 1872 in Prizren, and written in Ottoman Turkish. Albanian oral customary laws have been collected in different regions and published during the 20th and 21st centuries:
The Old Kanun (Kanun of Lekë Dukagjini);
The Kanun of Mirdita;
The Kanun of Pukë;
The Kanun of Skanderbeg also known as The Kanun of Arbëria.
The Kanun of Dibra;
The Kanun of Çermenikë;
The Kanun of Labëria, also known as The Kanun of Papa Zhuli (Kanuni i Papa Zhulit) or Kanun of Idriz Suli (Kanuni i Idriz Sulit).

Translations
German Baroness Marie Amelie von Godin, in collaboration with Eqrem Vlora, at the request of the Franciscans, started from the year 1938 the systematic translation in German of the Kanun of Lekë Dukagjini on the basis of an earlier codification in Albanian by Gjeçovi. It was published in the 1950s, shortly before the author's death. Von Godin's work was republished in 2001, edited by Robert Elsie with an introduction by Michael Schmidt-Neke. An Italian translation of the Kanun of Lekë Dukagjini was published in 1941, translated by the Franciscan Pal Dodaj, and edited by Gjergj Fishta and Giuseppe Schirò, with the introduction by Federico Pateta, and republished in 2009 with the introduction by Donato Martucci. A dual English-Albanian version of the Kanun of Lekë Dukagjini was published in 1989, and then republished in 1992. An Italian translation of the Kanun of Skanderbeg was published in 2017, translated by Genc Lafe and edited by Donato Martucci.

Content 
The Kanun is based on four pillars:
 Honour
 Hospitality
 Right Conduct
 Kin Loyalty

The Kanun of Lekë Dukagjini is composed of 12 books and 1,262 articles. The books and their subdivisions are as follows:

Kanun in literature and film
Albanian writer Ismail Kadare evokes the Kanun several times in his books, and it is the main theme in his novel Broken April. He also evokes the kanun in his novel , where Kadare literally describes the Monastir massacre of 1830 as the struggle between two empires: the Albanian Kanun with its code of besa and the Ottoman Empire itself. According to Kadare in his literary critique book , where loser refers to the great number of tragedies that were lost from Aeschylus, there are evident similarities between the kanun and the vendetta customs in all Mediterranean countries.

Barbara Nadel's Deep Waters refers to Kanun and Gjakmarrja.

Joshua Marston's 2011 film The Forgiveness of Blood, a drama set in modern-day Albania, deals with the Kanun. The film relates a blood feud between two families in Northern Albania, focusing primarily on how the feud affects the children of one family.

In season 6, episode 9 of Law & Order: Criminal Intent ("Blasters") the Kanun is referred to as explanation for the sudden retreat of a group of Albanian assassins.

The Kanun plays a major role in the Belgian movie Dossier K.

Elvira Dones' Sworn Virgin refers to Kanun and women's practice of swearing celibacy in return for being accepted as men by all local villagers.

Belgian TV maker Tom Waes visited Albania during one of the shows in his series Reizen Waes. He was served spit-roasted goat and was offered the goat's head, in keeping with Kanun rules about honoring a guest at dinner.

The Kanun is referred to in "The Closer" Season 6 | Episode 14 "The investigation into the Albanian blood feud"

See also
 History of Albania
 History of Kosovo
 Constitution of Albania
 Blood money
 Honour killing
 Blood Law
 Love

References

Sources

 (31 pages).

Further reading
 Albania Takes Aim at a Deadly Tradition
 The criminal law in the "Kanun of Lekë Dukagjini"

Albanian culture
Albanian traditions
Legal codes
Legal history of Albania
Honor
Customary legal systems
Codes of conduct